Rudersdorf is a town in the district of Jennersdorf in the Austrian state of Burgenland.

Geography
Cadastral communities are Dobersdorf and Rudersdorf.

Population

References

Cities and towns in Jennersdorf District
Slovenian communities in Burgenland